Companionship (subtitled Jazz Joint 2) is a double album compiling recordings from 1964 to 1970 by American jazz saxophonist/flautist Sahib Shihab which was released on the German Vogue Schallplatten label.

Reception

AllMusic gave the album 4½ stars.

Track listing
 "Om Mani Padme Hum" (Francy Boland) – 5:41  
 "Bohemia After Dark" (Oscar Pettiford) – 3:40  
 "Companionship" (Sahib Shihab, Niels-Henning Ørsted Pedersen) – 3:33  
 "Stoned Ghosts" (Benny Bailey) – 5:04  
 "Jay – Jay" (Kenny Clarke) – 2:52  
 "Dijdar" (Jimmy Woode) – 4:24  
 "Con Alma" (Dizzy Gillespie) – 5:05  
 "CT + CB" (Bailey) – 5:22  
 "The Turk's Bolero" (Boland) – 2:50  
 "Talk Some Yak-Ee-Dak" (Woode) – 3:32  
 "Calypso Blues" (Nat King Cole) – 4:07  
 "Balafon" (Boland) – 3:06  
 "I'm a Fool to Want You" (Frank Sinatra, Jack Wolf, Joel Herron) – 4:23  
 "Insensatez" (Antônio Carlos Jobim, Vinícius de Moraes) – 2:42  
 "Invitation" (Bronisław Kaper) – 4:39  
 "Yah-Yah Blues" (Shihab) – 4:01  
 "Serenata" (Leroy Anderson) – 3:26  
 "Just Give Me Time" (Boland) – 3:13  
 "Born to Be Blue" (Mel Tormé, Robert Wells) – 3:49  
 "Sconsolato" (Woode) – 2:30

Personnel 
Sahib Shihab – baritone saxophone, flute
Benny Bailey – trumpet, flugelhorn (tracks 3, 4 & 8)
Idrees Sulieman – trumpet (track 9)
Åke Persson – trombone (tracks 6 & 9) 
Francy Boland – piano (tracks 1, 2, 5, 7, 9, 11, 12 & 14–20)
Jimmy Woode – bass, vocals
Kenny Clarke – drums 
Fats Sadi – vibraphone percussion (tracks 1, 2, 5, 7, 11, 12 & 14–20)
Joe Harris – percussion (tracks 1, 2, 5, 7, 11, 12 & 14–20)
Milt Jackson – vocals (track 13)

References 

1971 albums
Sahib Shihab albums